Savin Hill is a section of Dorchester, Boston, Massachusetts, United States. 

Savin Hill may also refer to:
 Savin Hill Beach, a public beach in Dorchester
Savin Hill station, a rapid transit station in Dorchester
Savin Hill (album), a 2003 album by the Street Dogs